Cytochrome P450 2F1 is a protein that in humans is encoded by the CYP2F1 gene.

This gene encodes a member of the cytochrome P450 superfamily of enzymes. The cytochrome P450 proteins are monooxygenases which catalyze many reactions involved in drug metabolism and synthesis of cholesterol, steroids and other lipids. This protein localizes to the endoplasmic reticulum and is known to dehydrogenate 3-methylindole, an endogenous toxin derived from the fermentation of tryptophan, as well as xenobiotic substrates, such as naphthalene and ethoxycoumarin. This gene is part of a large cluster of cytochrome P450 genes from the CYP2A, CYP2B and CYP2F subfamilies on chromosome 19q.

References

External links

Further reading